Sekigawa is a Japanese surname.

People using this name include:

 "Mr. Sekigawa" (stagename) alternate ringname for professional wrestler Mr. Pogo
 Hideo Sekigawa (1908–1977), Japanese film director
 Ikuma Sekigawa (born 2000), Japanese soccer player
 Shusui Sekigawa (born 1913), Japanese rower
 Tetsuo Sekigawa (1951–2017), Japanese pro-wrestler

See also

 
 
 Seki (disambiguation)
 Gawa (disambiguation)